Percutaneous transtracheal ventilation is the delivery of oxygen to the lungs through an over-the-needle catheter inserted through the skin into the trachea using a high pressure gas source is considered a form of conventional ventilation.

Percutaneous transtracheal ventilation may be mistaken for transtracheal jet ventilation, which is not considered conventional ventilation and refers to high-frequency ventilation; a low tidal volume ventilation and needs specialized ventilators only available in critical care units.

References

Mechanical ventilation
Respiratory therapy
Intensive care medicine
Emergency medicine